The Embassy of Sweden in Helsinki is Sweden's diplomatic mission in Finland. It is located at Esplanadi. The current ambassador of Sweden to Finland, since 2020, is Nicola Clase.

The building 
The embassy building was built in 1839 to be businessman J. H. Heidenstrauchs home. It became an embassy in the 1920s. It was originally designed by architect A. F. Granstedt, but after becoming an embassy, it was heavily changed. The architect of this was Swedish Torben Grut, who designed it to look like the Stockholm Palace.

Heads of Mission

See also 
 List of Ambassadors of Sweden to Finland
 Finland-Sweden relations
 Foreign relations of Sweden
 1906 Helsinki bank robbery

References

External links 

 of Sweden in Helsinki

Buildings and structures in Helsinki
Sweden
Helsinki
Finland–Sweden relations
Kruununhaka